Clothing insulation is the thermal insulation provided by clothing.

Even if the main role of clothing is to protect from the cold, protective clothing also exists to protect from heat, such as for metallurgical workers or firemen. As regards thermal comfort, only the first case is considered.

Thermophysiological comfort 
Thermophysiological comfort is the capacity of the clothing material that makes the balance of moisture and heat between the body and the environment. It is a property of textile materials that creates ease by maintaining moisture and thermal levels in a human's resting and active states. The selection of textile material significantly affects the comfort of the wearer. Different textile fiber holds individual properties that suit in different environments. Natural fibers breathable and absorbs moisture, and synthetic fibers are hydrophobic; they repel moisture and do not allow air to pass. Different environments demand a diverse selection of clothing materials. Hence the appropriate choice is important. The major determinants that influence Thermophysiological comfort are the permeable construction, heat, and moisture transfer rate.

Mechanisms of insulation
There are three kinds of heat transfer: conduction (exchange of heat through contact), convection (movement of fluids), and radiation.

Air has a low thermal conductivity but is very mobile. There are thus two elements that are important in protecting from the cold:

 setting up a layer of still air which serves as insulation, by the use of fibres (wool, fur, et cetera)
 stopping the wind from penetrating and replacing the layer of warm air close to the body

Another important factor is humidity. Water is a better conductor of heat than air, thus if clothes are damp — because of sweat, rain, or immersion — water replaces some or all of the air between the fibres of the clothing, causing thermal loss through conduction and/or evaporation.

Thermal insulation is thus optimal with three layers of clothing:
 a layer near the body for hygiene (changed more often than the other clothing), whose role is to get rid of sweat so it does not remain in contact with the skin;
 an outer close-knit or closely woven layer as a wind breaker, usually thin — if there is a risk of precipitation this should be impermeable, the ideal being a textile that stops water droplets but allows water vapor to pass so as to remove evaporated sweat (a textile of this sort is said to "breathe");
 and between the two, a "thick" layer that traps the air and prevents contact between the skin and the wind-breaking layer (which, as it is thin, gets close to the ambient temperature).

The three layers of air between the skin and the exterior layer also play an insulating role. If the clothing is squeezed tight (as by the straps of a backpack), insulation will be poorer in those places.

Units and measurement

Clothing insulation may be expressed in clo units.  The clo has the same dimensions as the R value (square metre kelvins per watt or m2⋅K/W) used to describe insulation used in residential and commercial construction—thus, the higher the value, the better the insulation performance.
 1 clo = 0.155 K·m2·W−1 ≈ 0.88 K·m2·BTU·W−1·ft−2·°F−1·hr−1 R. One clo is the amount of insulation that allows a person at rest to maintain thermal equilibrium in an environment at 21°C (70°F) in a normally ventilated room (0.1 m/s air movement).

There are a number of ways to determine clothing insulation provided by clothes, but the most accurate according to ASHRAE Fundamentals are measurements on heated manikins and on active subjects. Equations may then be used to calculate the thermal insulation.
Because clothing insulation cannot be measured for most routine engineering applications, tables of measured values for various clothing ensembles can be used.
According to ASHRAE-55 2010 standard, there are three methods for estimating clothing insulation using the tables provided.
 If the ensemble in question matches reasonably well with one on Table 1, the indicated value of intrinsic clothing insulation can be used;
 It is acceptable to add or subtract garments on Table 2 from the ensembles in Table 1 to estimate the insulation of ensembles that differ in garment composition;
 It is possible to define a complete clothing ensemble as a combination of individual garments using Table 2.

Another unit that is used is the "tog":
 1 tog = 0.1 K·m2·W−1 ≈ 0.645 clo
 1 clo = 1.55 togs
The name comes from the word "togs", British slang for clothes.

Clothing ensembles and garments

Further considerations and examples
Other factors that influence the clothing insulation are posture and activity. Sitting or lying change the thermal insulation due to the compression of air layers in the clothing, but at the same time - depending on the materials that are made of - chairs and bedding can provide considerable insulation. While it is possible to determine the increase of insulation provided by chairs, sleeping or resting situations are more difficult to evaluate unless the individual is completely immobile.
Body motion decreases the insulation of a clothing ensemble by pumping air through clothing openings and/or causing air motion within the clothing. This effect varies considerably depending on the nature of the motion and of the clothing. Accurate estimates of clothing insulation for an active person are therefore not available, unless measurements are made for the specific condition (e.g., with a walking manikin).
A rough estimate of the clothing insulation for an active person is:

Icl, active = Icl ×(0.6+0.4/M)         1.2 met < M < 2.0 met

where M is the metabolic rate in met units and Icl is the insulation without activity. For metabolic rates less than or equal to 1.2 met, no adjustment is recommended.

Clothing insulation is correlated with outdoor air temperature, indoor operative temperatures, relative humidity and also by the presence of a dress code in the environment in question.
Recent studies have developed dynamic predictive clothing insulation models that allow more precise thermal comfort calculation, energy simulation, HVAC sizing and building operation than previous practice. As a matter of fact, usually simplifications are used (0.5 clo in the summer, 1.0 in the winter). This may lead to systems that are incorrectly sized and/or operated. A model that is able to predict how building occupants change their clothing would greatly improve HVAC system operation.

As mentioned, clothing adaptation has an important role in achieving thermal comfort and is probably the most effective adjustment that occupants can make to adapt themselves in a thermal environment. Moreover, clothing variability may also depend on factors unrelated to thermal conditions, such as for a dress code or social influences, style preferences that may differ due to gender or work position. According to ASHRAE-55 standard, only if individuals are freely making adjustments in clothing to suit their thermal preferences, it is acceptable to use a single representative average value for everyone.

Some basic insulation values can be considered as examples of typical conditions
 naked body: 0 ;
 summer clothing: 0.6 clo ;
 ski outfit: 2 clo ;
 light polar equipment: 3 clo ;
 heavy polar equipment: 4 clo ;
 polar down duvet: 8 clo.

Temperature of thermal equilibrium

The ambient temperature at which someone's body will be at thermal equilibrium depends on the rate of heat generation per unit area P and the thermal insulance of the clothing R. The empirical formula is:

 T = 31°C − P·R
or, if R is taken to be the number of clos and P the number of watts per square metre,
 T = (31 − 0.155·P·R)°C

 Temperature of thermal equilibrium
 person in summer dress (shorts and bare torso) at rest (P = 60 W/m2, R = 0.4 clo): T = +27 °C;
 heavy polar equipment, at rest (P = 60 W/m2, R = 4 clo): T = −6 °C;
 slow walking in light polar equipment (P = 120 W/m2, R = 3 clo): T = −25 °C;
 sleeping in a polar duvet (P = 48 W/m2, R = 8 clo): T = −28 °C;
 fast walking in heavy polar equipment (P = 180 W/m2, R = 4 clo) : T = −80 °C.

See also
 Wind chill
 Comfort
 Clothing

References

Clothing